Harvey M. Johnsen (July 16, 1895 – September 15, 1975) was a United States circuit judge of the United States Court of Appeals for the Eighth Circuit.

Education and career

Born in Hastings, Nebraska, Johnsen received a Bachelor of Laws from the University of Nebraska College of Law in 1919 and an Artium Baccalaureus from the University of Nebraska–Lincoln in 1921. He was in private practice in Omaha, Nebraska from 1920 to 1931, and a faculty member at the Creighton University School of Law in Omaha from 1922 to 1926. He was general counsel to the Farm Credit Administration in Omaha from 1931 to 1933, returning to private practice there from 1934 to 1938. On Nov. 28, 1938, he was appointed by Governor Robert Leroy Cochran to be an associate justice of the Supreme Court of Nebraska. Johnsen's term began January 3, 1939, lasting until he resigned November 8, 1940.

Education and career

Johnsen was nominated by President Franklin D. Roosevelt on October 1, 1940, to the United States Court of Appeals for the Eighth Circuit, to a new seat authorized by 54 Stat. 219. He was confirmed by the United States Senate on October 7, 1940, and received his commission on October 14, 1940. He served as Chief Judge and as a member of the Judicial Conference of the United States from 1959 to 1965. He assumed senior status on August 1, 1965. His service terminated on September 15, 1975, due to his death.

References

Sources
 

1895 births
1975 deaths
Justices of the Nebraska Supreme Court
Judges of the United States Court of Appeals for the Eighth Circuit
United States court of appeals judges appointed by Franklin D. Roosevelt
20th-century American judges